Olpe is a Kreis (district) in the south-east of North Rhine-Westphalia, Germany. Neighboring districts are Märkischer Kreis, Hochsauerland, Siegen-Wittgenstein, Altenkirchen, Oberbergischer Kreis.

History 
The district was created in 1817 as Kreis Bilstein, in 1819 the capital was set to be Olpe. During the reorganization of the districts in 1969 several of the municipalities in the district were merged to become cities, however the district itself was only modified minimally, and also in the second reorganization 1974 it stayed nearly in the same borders as in 1817.

Geography 
Geographically it covers the south-western part of the Sauerland mountains, which make the district rich in forests. The main river through the district is the Lenne.

Schützenbund
The Kreisschützenbund Olpe performs the Kreisschützenfest.

Coat of arms 
The left half of the coat of arms show the cologne cross, as the Olpe area belonged to the bishops of Cologne. The right side show the sign of the Lords of Fürstenberg, who were governors for the bishops in this area.

Towns and municipalities

References

External links 

Official Webpage
Der Vokalismus der Mundarten im Kreise Olpe

 
Districts of North Rhine-Westphalia